Rasmus Paludan (born 2 January 1982) is a Danish-Swedish politician, lawyer and far-right extremist. He is the leader of the far-right Danish political party Stram Kurs ("Straight Course" or "Hard Line"), which he founded in 2017. Paludan has held several events in which the Quran was burned, leading to counter-protests, some marked by violence and burning of cars.

Family, education, and early career 
Paludan is the older brother of poet Tine Paludan and writer Martin Paludan. Paludan himself has a migration background as his father is Swedish journalist Tomas Polvall and he has lived in Sweden at times, which he says gives him the right to Swedish citizenship. In October 2020 Paludan was officially declared a Swedish citizen by authorities as his father is Swedish.

According to his father, Paludan had to pause his studies due to an accident where he was hit by a car while cycling and had to undergo brain surgery. He has a bachelor's degree in law.

As of September 2022, Paludan was studying theology at the University of Copenhagen.

Legal career
Paludan has acted as defence attorney in a number of cases involving self-styled "critics of the system" and proponents of medical cannabis, such as Lars Kragh Andersen, but also in several cases involving immigrant asylum. Between September 2015 and August 2018 Paludan was employed as a lecturer at the law faculty of the University of Copenhagen in the areas of civil law and property law.

Policies and demonstrations 
In 2016 Paludan started attending meetings of the International Free Press Society, and participated in all the demonstrations of the anti-Islamic group For Frihed (formerly Pegida Denmark) that year. He also held a speech at one of their demonstrations.

Paludan founded the Stram Kurs party in 2017 which present strong extremist views on Islam and non-western immigration. Paludan is strongly opposed to non-Western immigration and Islam's presence in Denmark. He is well known for his numerous events and political demonstrations, often in areas with many Muslim immigrants. During these demonstrations, he has presented anti-immigrant and racist statements and taunted Muslims (and Islam as a whole), often resulting in counter-protests. At his protests, Paludan has burned the Quran and defaced it in other ways that many Muslims find offensive. Videos of the subsequent confrontations are shared on YouTube where his party has gathered a large following. Ideologically, some observers have considered Paludan a counter-jihadist, but he considers himself to be an ethno-nationalist.

Paludan calls for putting expelled foreign citizens unwilling and unable to travel back to their country in detention camps in North-Eastern Greenland, which is a Danish island.

In June 2020, Paludan held a demonstration in Aarhus, Denmark, when a 52-year-old man pulled out a knife, entered the cordoned-off area, and ran towards Paludan. Police fired a warning shot, but the assailant did not lay down his weapon, whereupon police opened fire and wounded the assailant in the leg. In the aftermath, there was unrest in the area. Police were hit by fireworks and rocks were thrown by other assailants in the Gellerup area of Aarhus.

Paludan is under constant police protection.

Quran incidents

In April 2019, Paludan held a demonstration in Viborg, Denmark, which led to chaos with the presence of about 100 counter-protesters. Three people were arrested and, in June 2019, a 24-year-old Syrian in Denmark was sentenced to 60 days in jail for having thrown a rock at Paludan. The offender was also to be deported after the jail term, and was banned from returning to Denmark for six years.

In connection with a planned Quran burning in Malmö in August 2020, Paludan was banned from entering Sweden for two years, but in October he was granted Swedish citizenship due to his father's citizenship.

In April 2022, Paludan again organised and announced several demonstrations in major Swedish cities, where he burned or said that he would burn the Quran. This led to rioting by counter protesters, including destruction of private and public property and attacks on police. Riots also erupted in the lead-up to his demonstration.

On 21 January 2023 Paludan took part in a small demonstration, set up by pro-Kremlin journalist Chang Frick, in front of the Turkish embassy in Stockholm and set fire to the Quran with a lighter, upsetting Turkey and  causing repercussions regarding Sweden's application to join NATO.

Controversies

Stalking case 
In January 2013, Paludan was given a 5-year restraining order, forbidding him from contacting a then-24-year-old man whom he had been stalking since 2010, when they both started at the University of Copenhagen. Despite the restraining order, the harassment continued until December 2013. In 2015, Paludan was fined for offending the police officer who handled the stalking case.

Sexually charged chats with underage boys 

In August 2021, it was revealed through an investigation by Danish newspaper Ekstra Bladet that Paludan, through his Discord server, had been talking about hardcore fetish sex with minors ranging in age from 13 to 17. Paludan did not deny the claims, but denied any wrongdoing, stating that he did not know how old the people he was talking to were, and that the boys or the moderators in the chat would have stopped him if he had overstepped any boundaries.

Ban from the United Kingdom 
On 20th March 2023 Pauludan was banned from entering the United Kingdom, after threatening to burn a copy of the Quran in the British city of Wakefield during an upcoming visit.

Court appearances
In 2019, a Danish court found Paludan guilty of racism and was given a suspended jail sentence.
In 2020, a Danish court jailed Paludan for a month in jail for a number of offences, including racism, which he appealed.
In 2021, a Danish appeal court found Paludan guilty of racism and defamation. His sentence was changed to a suspended sentence.

References

External links

1982 births
Living people
Anti-Islam sentiment in Denmark
Islamophobia in Sweden
Anti-Turkish sentiment
Anti–Middle Eastern sentiment
Danish critics of Islam
21st-century Danish lawyers
Political party founders
People convicted of racial hatred offences
Counter-jihad activists
Critics of multiculturalism
The New Right (Denmark) politicians
Venstre (Denmark) politicians
Danish Social Liberal Party politicians
Leaders of political parties in Denmark
Swedish people of Danish descent
Swedish critics of Islam